GURPS Martial Arts is a source book for the GURPS role-playing game, published by Steve Jackson Games; the most recent edition, by Peter Dell'Orto and Sean Punch, was released in 2007. GURPS Martial Arts includes new perks, skills, techniques, styles, weapons, and combat rules for GURPS, as well as history on the martial arts, pregenerated NPCs, and ideas for martial-arts campaigns. The book is an essential for any game that features large amounts of melee combat, in any genre or setting.

Contents

Fourth edition
This is a greatly expanded version of the third-edition GURPS Martial Arts source book, revised to work with the fourth-edition GURPS rules. It adds updated versions of combat rules from third-edition books like GURPS Compendium II, many of the weapons and weapon customization rules from GURPS Low Tech, and martial arts-related elements taken from third-edition historical worldbooks such as GURPS Japan and GURPS Swashbucklers. Detailed rules for low-tech battlefield weapons and armor will be reserved for GURPS Low Tech, while rules for firearms and Gun Fu will be covered in the fourth-edition version of GURPS High-Tech.

Publication history

Third edition
Game designer C.J. Carella began working in the role-playing game industry with GURPS Martial Arts, published in 1990.

Fourth edition
The authors are Peter Dell'Orto and Sean Punch, who were inspired by but did not reuse the original text written by CJ Carella.

Reception
Reviewed in White Wolf #27.

See also
List of GURPS books

References

External links
Thread on SJGames Forum regarding forthcoming book Includes comments by GURPS Line Editor Sean Punch.
Official website The book's official page on the Steve Jackson Games website.

GURPS 3rd edition
GURPS 4th edition
Martial Arts
Martial arts role-playing games
Role-playing game supplements introduced in 1990